Cat Girl Manor, also known as The Chateau, is a private residence in El Paso County, Colorado, United States, known for hosting kittenplay. It has been described as "the Playboy Mansion of the kitten play community". The manor has been featured on the Viceland television series Slutever. Some of the "kittens" perform "purrlesque", a variation of burlesque.

See also 
 Animal roleplay
 Playboy Mansion

References

External links
 
  (May 10, 2018), Vice
  (May 17, 2021), RepZilla

BDSM
El Paso County, Colorado
Sexual roleplay